C74 or C-74 may be:

 C-74 Globemaster, transport aircraft with transoceanic range
 In lighting, a reversed clothespin used to hold gels and light screens in theatrical productions
 Comiket 74, The 74th Comiket Convention in Japan
 Ruy Lopez (Spanish Game) opening, Encyclopaedia of Chess Openings
 Adrenal tumor ICD-10 code
 Cycling '74, a software development company known for distributing Max/MSP
 Caldwell 74 (NGC 3132, the Eight-Burst Nebula, or the Southern Ring Nebula), a planetary nebula in the constellation Vela